Junjiahua, Junhua, Junsheng, or "military speech" in English, is any of a number of isolated dialects in Guangdong, Guangxi, Hainan, Fujian, and Taiwan region. Some believe that they are a Mandarin dialect group that assimilated to local Chinese variants in southern China. Junhua began as a lingua franca in the army, being spoken between soldiers dispatched to all parts of China during the Ming dynasty. It was subsequently spread to areas around the camps where the army settled. It is now an endangered language. In Hainan, it's still spoken by about 100,000 people. These speakers mainly live in Sanya, Changjiang Li Autonomous County, Danzhou, Dongfang, and Lingao.

Some also consider the Dapenghua spoken in Dapeng Peninsula of Shenzhen to be a form of Junjiahua.

References

Endangered languages
Varieties of Chinese
Languages of China
Languages of Taiwan
Military life
Languages attested from the 2nd millennium
Military history of the Ming dynasty